This is a comparison of Usenet newsreaders.

Legend:

See also
 alt.* hierarchy
 List of newsgroups
 List of Usenet newsreaders
 News server
 Newsreader (Usenet)
 Network News Transfer Protocol
 Usenet newsgroup

References

Newsreaders